Bernd Hessel (born 3 July 1961, in Munich) is a West German sprint canoer who competed in the early to mid-1980s. He won a bronze medal in the K-4 1000 m event at the 1982 ICF Canoe Sprint World Championships in Belgrade.

Hessel also finished eighth in the K-4 1000 m event at the 1984 Summer Olympics in Los Angeles.

References

Sports-reference.com profile

1961 births
Canoeists at the 1984 Summer Olympics
German male canoeists
Living people
Sportspeople from Munich
Olympic canoeists of West Germany
ICF Canoe Sprint World Championships medalists in kayak